HQ-2J or Hongqi-2 (红旗二号导弹) are anti-aircraft missiles mounted on the Type 77 transporter launcher. It is an upgraded version of the HQ-2 system. The HQ-1/HQ-2 are developed from the Soviet S-75 Dvina SA-2 system. The HQ-2 has been China's primary air defence system for over forty years but since 2016 it is being replaced by the HQ-22 system.

The HQ-2J was developed by China National Precision Machinery Import and Export Corporation (CPMIEC) for the PLA Army.

Also Iran developed Sayyad-1 missile from HQ-2 missile.

See also
 Sayyad-1

References

Missile defense
Surface-to-air missiles of the People's Republic of China
Weapons of the People's Republic of China

de:HQ-2
ru:HQ-2